Lori Mann Bruce currently serves as Provost and Vice President for Academic Affairs and holds the title of Professor of Electrical and Computer Engineering at Tennessee Technological University.  As the Provost, she provides leadership to and oversight of eight colleges and schools, offering bachelors, masters, and doctoral programs.  Prior to joining Tennessee Tech University, Bruce served as Associate Vice President for Academic Affairs and Dean of the Graduate School at Mississippi State University. While at Mississippi State University, Bruce was awarded the university's highest academic honor, being named a William L. Giles Distinguished Professor. As a faculty member in electrical and computer engineering, she has served as the Principal Investigator or Co-PI on more than 20 funded research grants and contracts, totaling approximately $20 million from federal agencies.  Through her research in the areas of hyperspectral remote sensing, pattern recognition, automated target recognition, and precision agriculture, Bruce has served as major professor or graduate committee member for approximately 75 Masters and PhD students and has over 130 refereed publications.

References

Mississippi State University faculty
21st-century American engineers
University of Alabama alumni
Living people
Georgia Tech alumni
Year of birth missing (living people)